Strang may refer to:

People
 Strang (surname)
 Baron Strang, UK peerage

Places
 Strang, Oklahoma
 Strang, Nebraska
 Strang, Isle of Man